Richard Craig may refer to:
 Richard Craig (politician)
 Richard Craig (adventurer)
 Richard Craig (priest)